Ken Nicol is a Canadian politician and academic.

He served as the MLA for Lethbridge-East from 1993 to 2004. During his final three years, he was the leader of the Alberta Liberal Party, and leader of the official opposition in the Legislative Assembly of Alberta. He was credited with bringing a more conciliatory approach in the legislature, different from his predecessor Nancy MacBeth, however his soft-spoken nature did not help the party rise in polls.

He left provincial politics to run for the federal Liberals in the riding of Lethbridge in 2004, but lost in a landslide to incumbent Rick Casson.

Nicol is currently an associate professor at the University of Lethbridge.

References

External links
Legislative Assembly of Alberta Members Listing

Leaders of the Alberta Liberal Party
Alberta Liberal Party MLAs
1944 births
Living people
Candidates in the 2004 Canadian federal election
People from Lethbridge
Academic staff of the University of Lethbridge
Liberal Party of Canada candidates for the Canadian House of Commons